Michael Birkedal (born 18 November 1959) is a Danish retired footballer.

References

External links
 DBU profile
 
 

Living people
1959 births
Danish men's footballers
Denmark international footballers
Denmark youth international footballers
Association football midfielders
Næsby Boldklub players
FC Twente players
Ikast FS players
FC La Chaux-de-Fonds players
Danish 1st Division players
Eredivisie players
Eerste Divisie players
Danish expatriate men's footballers
Danish expatriate sportspeople in the Netherlands
Danish expatriate sportspeople in Switzerland
Expatriate footballers in the Netherlands
Expatriate footballers in Switzerland
Footballers from Copenhagen